The Boten–Vientiane railway is the Lao section of the Lao–China Railway (LCR), running between the capital Vientiane and the northern town of Boten on the border with Yunnan, China. The line was officially opened on 3 December 2021.

A collaboration project between Laos and China, the line's northern end is directly connected to the Chinese rail system at Mohan in Yunnan, through the Yuxi–Mohan railway, and has provisions in the south to link with the Bangkok–Nong Khai high-speed railway in Thailand and possibly all the way to Singapore via HSR. The railway ends at Vientiane South cargo station. The Boten–Vientiane railway is an integral section of the central line on the Kunming–Singapore railway, and was constructed as part of the Belt and Road Initiative (BRI).

History

Planning
Laos is the only landlocked country in Southeast Asia, which gives it a competitive disadvantage in trade. During the French rule, the French failed to materialize a possible plan to build a railway in Laos, with only the  Don Det–Don Khon railway being completed. A railway link through Laos would greatly reduce cargo transit times and transportation costs between Laos and China.

The first talks about the railway linking Laos and China began in 2001; Lao politician of Chinese descent Somsavat Lengsavad was reportedly the driving force behind the project on the Laotian side. In October 2010, plans were announced for a  standard gauge railway linking Vientiane to Xishuangbanna, in Yunnan province in China. Construction was expected to begin in 2011, for completion in 2014. There were plans to extend this railway south from Vientiane to Bangkok. 

The project initially stalled in the wake of the corruption scandal of China's minister of railways Liu Zhijun in 2011, but negotiations continued. In November 2012, the Laotian press was reporting that the money for the construction of the railway would be borrowed from the EXEM Bank of China; the construction would be started in 2013, and complete in 2018.  By 2015, a revised plan was agreed upon in which both countries would jointly finance and operate the railway under a build-operate-transfer arrangement. Construction work worth US$1.2 billion was awarded to the China Railway Group in September 2015.

Construction and completion
Construction began at Luang Prabang on 25 December 2016. At the end of 2017, the construction phase was 20% completed, and in September 2019 progress was reported as 80% completed. Unexploded bombs that have been dropped during the Vietnam War would also be removed along the route.

, Chinese state media reported that the US$6 billion project was 90% done. Work crews started laying track in Laos in March 2020, five years after breaking ground. With all of the many dozen tunnels and bridges completed, cargo service was scheduled to start from December 2021. In April 2021 the northernmost section in Luang Namtha Province was 97% complete. Track laying of the last started section in Oudomxay Province, would be completed in May, leaving the project well on track for a 2021 opening. Track-laying was officially completed on 12 October 2021. The first EMU was delivered to Vientiane on 16 October 2021, and the line opened on 3 December 2021, a day after the 46th anniversary of the Lao PDR.

The railway is expected to boost tourism, with passenger traffic to account for the majority of traffic on the line. The Thai province of Nong Khai is also expected to gain more visitors through the railway, as well as fruit exports from Thailand to China benefiting from reduced transportation costs.

Future expansion
Since the line uses a different rail gauge from the existing Thai Northeastern Line link from Bangkok to Thanaleng, running into Thailand is not yet possible for passenger trains. A branch to Thanaleng Dry Port freight yard was completed in July 2022 allowing transfer of cargo between Thai-Laos metre gauge railway and standard gauge railway. However, the Vientiane end of the line will eventually cross the Mekong River on a new bridge to meet up with the Bangkok–Nong Khai high-speed railway once it is completed, making the connection.

Financing

The cost of the project is estimated at US$5.965 billion or RMB 37.425 billion. The railway is funded by 60% of debt financing ($3.6 billion) from the Export-Import Bank of China and the remaining 40% ($2.4 billion) is funded by a joint venture company between the two countries. China holds 70% of the stake of the company. Of the rest of the stake, Lao government disburses $250 million from its national budget and borrows $480 million further from the Export-Import Bank of China. It is the most expensive and largest project to be constructed in Laos as of 2021.

The cost of the railway has contributed to a US$480 million increase in Lao debt to the Chinese Export Import Bank. Western publications subsequently claimed that Laos could end up falling into a default on its debts. In 2019, the Australian think-tank Lowy Institute estimated Laos' debt to China at 45 per cent of its GDP. In 2020, American credit agency Fitch Ratings assigned Laos a 'CCC' credit rating, stating that the country has "excessive debt".

Ridership

The Boten–Vientiane railway (also known as China-Laos Railway) has transported over 1 million passengers and 500,000 tonnes of cargo since it was launched in December 2021, according to the transport authorities of southwest China's Yunnan Province.

Infrastructure

47% of the railway is spanned over 75 tunnels and 15% is set on viaducts spread over 167 bridges. Vientiane railway station, the largest station on the railway, is situated in Xay Village in Xaythany District and consists of four platforms with seven track lines and two additional platforms with three lines reserved; it is expected to connect with other railway lines planned for Laos. The station can accommodate up to 2,500 passengers with a total area of 14,543 square metres.

The railway is built on a single track with passing loops and is electrified to China's Class I trunk railway standards, suitable for  passenger and  freight trains, making Laos the first country to connect to the Chinese railway network using Chinese technology.

Rolling stock

Passenger services employ CR200J trainsets, and for freight hauling, HXD3CA locomotives are used.

Cargo
On 4 December 2021, a day after opening the China–Laos railway, the Vientiane Logistics Park, one of a total of nine logistics centres in Laos, was officially opened by Prime Minister Phankham Viphavanh at Thanaleng.

List of stations 
32 stations are planned along the line, of which 21 stations were initially constructed including 10 passenger stations and 11 cargo stations:

Schedule and Ticket prices 

On 2022-Oct-09 it was announced, that an additional C92/C91 train will be in service from 2022-Oct-13, increasing the daily service to eight passenger trains:

As per June 2022, ticket prices in 1000 KIP are for 1st class (in red) / 2nd class (green) / Ordinary train (blue):

On 4 December 2022, the railway company announced its ticket reservation app for Android and iOS.  Users can purchase tickets seven days in advance via the app.

Controversies 
Radio Free Asia reported in October 2021 that some Lao villagers displaced from their land by the line's construction complained that they had still not received compensation.

In the first year of operation, the railway only allowed ticket purchases three days in advance and online sales were not available.  This resulted in extremely long lines at ticket offices and express trains often sell out the day ticket sales open.

See also 
 Rail transport in Laos
 Vientiane–Boten Expressway
 Railway stations in Laos
 China–Laos relations

References

External links
 Laos–China Railway Co., Ltd. – a joint venture between Laos and China to build and operate the railway.
 Official Facebook page with ticket availability
 Official Laos–China Railway ticketing app (Android)
 Boten–Vientiane railway on OpenStreetMap
 Boten–Vientiane railway on Google Maps
 Full construction details superimposed on a satellite map by Design for Conservation

Standard gauge railways in Laos
Railway lines in Laos
China–Laos relations
Belt and Road Initiative
Transport infrastructure in Laos
Railway lines opened in 2021